Meizodon regularis, the eastern crowned smooth snake, is a species of snakes in the subfamily Colubrinae. It is found in Africa.

References

External links 
 

Colubrids
Reptiles described in 1856
Taxa named by Johann Gustav Fischer